Melvyn Bragg on Class and Culture is a British documentary series about class and popular culture in the United Kingdom from 1911 to 2011. It is presented by Melvyn Bragg and was shown on BBC Two in 2012.

Episode list

External links 

2012 British television series debuts
2012 British television series endings
BBC television documentaries
English-language television shows